Sarvan is a village in Sailana Tehsil in Ratlam district of Madhya Pradesh, India. It belongs to Ujjain division. It is located 32 km north of District headquarters Ratlam and 298 km from State capital Bhopal. Sarvan Pin code is 457550 and postal head office is Sailana .

Sarvan is surrounded by Piploda Tehsil towards the north, Ratlam Tehsil towards the south, Jaora Tehsil towards the east, and Chhoti Sarwan Tehsil towards the west.

Ratlam, Banswara, Pratapgarh, and Mandsaur are the nearby cities to Sarvan.

Demographics

Malwi is the local language here.

Transportation

By Rail
There is no railway station with a distance of less than 10 km from Sarvan. However, Ratlam Junction railway station is a major railway station 20 km away from Sarvan.

By Bus
Sarvan is situated between Ratlam and Banswada root. From Ratlam, Sarvan is 32 km away. Bus is an easy way to reach Sarvan from Ratlam.

Education

Colleges near Sarvan
Shivang College Of Physiotherapy
Address : (aicte Approved) Pahadia Rd Jaora; Dist. Ratlam----457 226
Pt. Sivshaktilal Sharma Ay Mahavidyalaya
Address : ; Ratlam; Madhya Pradesh
Dr M.b. Sharma Nursing College
Address : ;474; Katju Nagar A Ratlam (m.p.) -- 4570021
Pandit Shivshaktilal Ayurvedic Medical College                             
Address : 497; Katju Nagar A Ratlam (m.p.) -- 4570021

Schools in Sarvan
Shabri Sansker Vidha Mandir Sarvan
Address : sarvan, sailana, ratlam, Madhya Pradesh . PIN- 457551          
Ganesh Gyan Mandir
Address : sarvan, sailana, ratlam, Madhya Pradesh . PIN- 457551
New Convent Sarvan
Address : sarvan, sailana, ratlam, Madhya Pradesh . PIN- 457551
G.g.m.s.sarvan
Address : sarvan, sailana, ratlam, Madhya Pradesh . PIN- 457551
G.b.m.s.sarvan
Address : sarvan, sailana, ratlam, Madhya Pradesh . PIN- 457551

Basic Information

Tehsil Name: Sailana

District: Ratlam

Division: Ujjain

State: Madhya Pradesh

Language: Malwi and Hindi, English

Time zone:	IST (UTC+5:30)

Elevation / Altitude: 494 meters. Above Sea level

Telephone Code / Std Code: 07413

Pin Code: 457550

Post Office Name: Sailana

Alternate Village Name: Sarwan

Villages in Ratlam district